John Axon GC (4 December 1900 – 9 February 1957) was an English train driver from Stockport (Edgeley Depot) who died while trying to stop a runaway freight train on a 1 in 58 gradient at Chapel-en-le-Frith in Derbyshire after a brake failure. The train consisted of an ex-LMS Stanier Class 8F 2-8-0 No. 48188 hauling 33 wagons and a brake van.

Life
John Axon was born on 4 December 1900 in Stockport, Cheshire. On leaving school he became an apprentice painter and decorator. In 1919 he joined the London and North Western Railway as a cleaner, later becoming a fireman. From 1921 he was an engine driver, serving with the London, Midland and Scottish Railway from 1923, and British Railways after 1948.

Accident
On the outward trip from Stockport to Buxton on 9 February 1957, Driver Axon had noticed a leak from the supply to the locomotive steam brake and had requested and received fitter's attention at the Buxton depot. On the return trip from Buxton to Stockport, the repair did not hold and the brake pipe fractured, disabling the locomotive steam brake and filling the cab with scalding steam, making it very difficult and painful for Axon and the fireman, Ron Scanlon, to reach the controls. Despite this, Axon and Scanlon managed to partly close the regulator and screw down the engine's tender brakes to negligible effect. The inability to use the locomotive's whistle meant that the crew of the banking engine at the rear of Axon's train remained unaware of the problems at the front and kept pushing the train towards Dove Holes summit.

Axon told Scanlon to jump off and attempt to apply the wagon brakes of the loose-coupled train. Due to the speed the train was travelling, Scanlon only managed to apply a few before the train reached the summit and began accelerating down the 1-in-58 gradient towards Chapel-en-le-Frith. As the crew of the banking engine reached the summit to let the train continue under its own power, they were alarmed to see the train accelerating away from them, and the guard frantically applying the brakes to his van.

At the time of the locomotive failure, Axon could have jumped clear of the then slow-moving train. However, aware of the danger that his train posed to life further down the line, he stayed at his post despite the scalding steam on the footplate.

Axon waved a warning to the signalman at Dove Holes, who enabled a DMU at Chapel-en-le-Frith to be moved to safety, but had no time to warn the crew of a passing Rowsley-to-Stockport freight service to accelerate. The runaway smashed into the rear of it, killing John Axon and John Creamer, the other freight train's guard. The signalman barely escaped as the 8F's tender sideswiped his box, destroying it.

Recognition

Axon was posthumously awarded the George Cross on 7 May 1957, which was donated to the National Railway Museum in York in 1978. He was also awarded the Order of Industrial Heroism by the Daily Herald.

He was the subject of a 1957 radio ballad (The Ballad of John Axon), the first of the series, written by Ewan MacColl and Peggy Seeger and produced by Charles Parker. A CD released in June 2008, 'Primary Transmission' by the artist Broadcaster on Red Grape Records, included the song 'Johnny' which is based on samples from the Ballad of John Axon and set to new music.
On 19 February 1981, a British Rail Class 86 electric locomotive number 86261 was named Driver John Axon, GC at a ceremony at Euston Station, London.

In February 2007, a DMU Class 150 train (150273) was named 'Driver John Axon, GC' at Buxton. This name has now passed onto a Class 156 DMU, 156460. A plaque commemorating the events was unveiled, to be mounted at Chapel-en-le Frith station. The plaque is now mounted on the station buildings at Chapel-en-le-Frith facing onto the southbound platform.

Family
On 17 September 1930 he married Gladys Richardson at St Matthew's Church, Stretford. They lived in Edgeley, Stockport and had two sons. His grandson, also named John Axon (1960 – 2008), was a television actor best known for his role as Nigel Harper in The Royal; he also played roles in series such as Life on Mars, City Central and Peak Practice.

See also
Benjamin Gimbert
Casey Jones
Norman Tunna
Wallace Oakes
André Tanguy
Jesús García
Lists of rail accidents

References

External links
GC citation in the London Gazette of 3 May 1957
GC Awards to Railwaymen
Official report on the collision
The Ballad of John Axon, BBC Radio
Article on the ballad

British recipients of the George Cross
British train drivers
1900 births
1957 deaths
People from Stockport
Railway accident deaths in England
Train collisions in the United Kingdom
Recipients of the Order of Industrial Heroism
British Rail people